Ladislav Tomaček (born 26 September 1982) is a Slovak football forward who plays for Sereď.

Career
He joined Spartak Trnava in January 2011 from Sereď. In 2011/2012 season of Europa League, he scored two crucial goals against Bulgarian giant Levski Sofia. His goals helped Trnava gain promotion to the next round.

Career statistics

External links
Corgoň Liga profile 

Spartak Trnava profile 
Šport.sk profile 
at fussballtransfers.com

References

1982 births
Living people
Slovak footballers
Association football forwards
FK Teplice players
FK Ústí nad Labem players
ŠK Eldus Močenok players
FK Dukla Banská Bystrica players
Expatriate footballers in the Czech Republic
Slovak Super Liga players
People from Galanta
Sportspeople from the Trnava Region